The Paisley Philosophical Institution (sometimes referred to as the Paisley Philosophical Society) is a cultural and educational organisation based in Paisley, Renfrewshire, Scotland. It was founded on 8 October 1808 with the aim of educating members in scientific matters, creating a museum and establishing a library.

The Institution has helped to found several local bodies, including the Paisley Free Library and Museum (1871), the Coats Observatory (1882) and Paisley Technical College and School of Art (1897; subsequently the University of Paisley, now part of the University of the West of Scotland).

See also
 Thomas Coats
 John Mills McCallum
 Morris Young

External links
 http://paisleyphilosophicalinstitution.blogspot.co.uk/
 https://www.facebook.com/paisleyphilosophicalinstitution/
 https://twitter.com/paisleyphiloso1

1808 establishments in Scotland
Educational institutions established in 1808
Learned societies of Scotland
Organisations based in Renfrewshire
Paisley, Renfrewshire
Scientific societies based in the United Kingdom